Lili Mirojnick (born April 9, 1984) is an American actress. She has appeared in guest roles in episodes of various television series, and may be best known for her main cast role as Det. Meredith McCarthy on the Syfy television series Happy!.

Early life 
Mirojnick was born in New York City to Barry Mirojnick and Ellen Mirojnick, an actress and costume designer. Her maternal grandparents were Abraham "Abe" Schneid and Sunny (née Schneider). Her parents divorced in 1987. She is of Eastern European and Mediterranean descent. She attended The Buckley School in Sherman Oaks, California, after attending the American Academy of Dramatic Arts (AADA) in New York, New York.

Career 
Mirojnick has appeared in a number of stage roles.

In 2005, Mirojnick began appearing in uncredited and minor film roles. In 2010, she won the lead role in the independent film Kill the Habit. From 2011–2014, she made a number of guest appearances in network television series including Person of Interest, Blue Bloods and Grey's Anatomy.

Mirojnick stars as Det. Meredith McCarthy in the Syfy series Happy! (2017).

Personal life 
Mirojnick resides in Los Angeles, California. She considers herself Jewish but non-religious.

Filmography

Film

Television

Theatre

References

External links 
 
 

1984 births
American film actresses
American television actresses
American stage actresses
Living people
Actresses from New York City
Actresses from Los Angeles
21st-century American women